Yusifbəyli (also, Yusifbeyli and Usubbeyli) is a village in the Qubadli Rayon of Azerbaijan.

In 2021, the 18th century mosque of Yusifbeyli was destroyed by an Azerbaijani road crew, in the process of widening an existing route.
 The mosque had previously been granted a status of an architectural monument of local importance by Azerbaijan.

References 

Populated places in Qubadli District